Danila Kumar International School is a public school in Slovenia that caters to students from over 40 nationalities, ranging from 3 to 15 years of age. It was established in 1993, and it has been an International Baccalaureate school since March 2, 1994. The school is named after the communist political commissar Danila Kumar (1921–1944).

Location
Danila Kumar International School is located in Ljubljana's Bežigrad District in the premises of Danila Kumar Primary School. It is surrounded by residential housing. Beyond the housing, fields and the Kleče Pumping Station lie to the west, and to the east are more fields and the Sava River. The H3 expressway runs south of the neighborhood.

References

External links

Danila Kumar International School website
Danila Kumar International School  at Geopedia

International schools in Slovenia
Schools in Ljubljana
Primary schools in Slovenia
Educational institutions established in 1993
1993 establishments in Slovenia